Exelastis pilum is a moth of the family Pterophoridae. It is found in the Democratic Republic of the Congo.

References
 , 2009: On a collection of Pterophoridae (Lepidoptera) from Haut-Katanga, Democratic Republic of the Congo. Revue Suisse de Zoologie 116 (2): 223-256.

Moths described in 2009
Exelastini
Insects of the Democratic Republic of the Congo
Moths of Africa
Endemic fauna of the Democratic Republic of the Congo